The 1939–40 Plunket Shield season was a tournament of the Plunket Shield, the domestic first-class cricket competition of New Zealand. It was the last season for six years until World War II had concluded.

Auckland won the championship, finishing at the top of the points table at the end of the round-robin tournament between the four first-class sides, Auckland, Canterbury, Otago and Wellington.

Table
Below are the Plunket Shield standings for the season:

References

Plunket Shield
Plunket Shield